The Development Bank of Saxony (known as SAB from the German name Sächsische Aufbaubank) was founded in 1991 and is the state development institution for the state of Saxony, Germany.

Activities
The Development Bank of Saxony allocates subsidies e.g. from the European Regional Development Fund in the form of grants, sureties and loans into various sectors of the economy e.g. technology, as well as into residential and municipal construction.

In the business year 2016, the bank made over 50,000 payments and grants totalling almost 1.4 billion euro and loans of over 450 million euro.

Location
The headquarters of the Development Bank of Saxony is in Leipzig since January 2017, although the headquarters building was completed only in 2021. A branch office will be kept at the former headquarter building in Dresden.

The bank also has customer centers in Leipzig, Dresden and Chemnitz and a regional office in Görlitz.

History 
From 1991 until 1995 the L-Bank, the state development bank of Baden-Württemberg, operated the bank. Then on December 19, 1995 the SAB GmbH was created as a subsidiary of the L-Bank. This took up the operation on June 1, 1996. Since December 30, 2002 the SAB is a 100% subsidy of the state of Saxony.

In 2003 its legal form was changed into an Institution under Public Law (de: Anstalt des öffentlichen Rechts).

References

Banks of Germany
Economy of Saxony